Romantic Heaven is a 2011 South Korean melodrama about fate, love, loss, and redemption.

Though the premise is sentimental, dealing with a variety of characters and their relationships in both life and the afterlife, it is very much in line with writer-director Jang Jin's previous works, combining elements of several different genres, including romance, comedy, drama, ghost and even police thriller into an eccentric, playful and imaginative film.

Plot
Three seemingly disconnected people cross paths at a hospital: Part one, "Mom," focuses on the character of Mimi, whose mother is battling cancer, and needs a bone marrow transplant if she is to have any hope of surviving. With great difficulty, doctors identify a potential donor, but then the man goes into flight after being accused of murder. Hoping to find him, Mimi becomes acquainted with the police detectives assigned to his case. Part two, "Wife," concerns a lawyer named Min-gyu who has recently lost his spouse. Amidst his grief, he is distracted by the fact that he can't find a bag that she had brought with her to the hospital, and which contained her personal diary. In the meantime, he is visited by an ex-convict who has a score to settle. Part three, "Girl," focuses on Ji-wook, a taxi driver whose grandfather is on the verge of death. One day his grandmother tells him that for all of his life, her husband has been unable to forget a young woman he met in his youth. It is in part four, "Romantic Heaven," that the various threads are brought together and ultimately resolved. As fate would have it, their counterparts are gazing down upon their loved ones from heaven, dealing with their own version of remorse and regret.

Cast
Kim Su-ro - Song Min-gyu
Kim Dong-wook - Dong Ji-wook 
Kim Ji-won - Choi Mimi
Lee Soon-jae - old man (God) 
Shim Eun-kyung - Kim Boon as a girl
Im Won-hee - Detective Kim 
Kim Won-hae - Detective Park 
Lee Han-wi - Peter, the secretary
Jeon Yang-ja - grandma
Kim Dong-joo - Mimi's mother
Lee Moon-soo - Ha-yeon's father
Kim Byung-ok - manhole man
Kim Jun-bae - Jang Heo-soo
Lee Yong-yi - Kim Boon as an old woman
Kim Jae-gun - old man
Lee Chul-min - Eung-shik
Lee Na-ra - Yoon-joo
Jung Gyu-soo - Ji-wook's doctor
Lee Jae-yong  - Mimi's doctor
Kim Il-woong - Lee Kang-shik
Seo Joo-ae - Park Joon-hee
Lee Sang-hoon - deputy director of taxi company
Kong Ho-seok - judge
Yoo Sun - Yeom Kyeong-ja (cameo)
Han Jae-suk - stalker (cameo)
Kim Mu-yeol - Dong Chi-sung (cameo)

Awards

References

External links 
  
 
 
 

2011 films
2011 fantasy films
South Korean romantic drama films
Films about the afterlife
Films directed by Jang Jin
Cinema Service films
2010s Korean-language films
2010s South Korean films